Khooni Panja is a 1991 low budget Hindi horror film of Bollywood directed and produced by Vinod Talwar.

Plot 
Seema's husband Ajit has an affair with another woman, Usha. One day, Seema catches them red-handed. Ajit and Usha kill Seema and bury her body secretly in a graveyard with the help of a gardener. After few days, a group of young girl students play volleyball near the graveyard. Suddenly, the ball lands in the yard. A young girl, Pinky Mehta, goes to get it. Seema's vengeful soul enters Pinky's body. While the servant Babulal tries to molest Pinky, the soul of Seema kills him. She also kills the gardener. Without knowing this, Ajit's brother Ajay marries Pinky. While the evil spirit is going to take revenge against her in-law's family, Ajay's mother calls an exorcist. The exorcist does his job and tells Ajay that not to stop while dumping the pot where the soul is kept under its control. While doing his job he sees a woman getting molested and when called out for help by the woman and he doesn't respond to her. But the efforts gets foiled when he gets mocked by those thugs. Enraged, he keeps the pot aside, thus fogetting his job and beats them. Seema's soul kills the exorcist and Ajit's mother. After knowing about his mother's death, Ajit then prepares to leave his residence with Usha, she calms him down by telling that it is good, but beware, he doesn't understand her words but she calms him down. They go to their home and see that Pinky is standing getting out of her room, introducing herself sweetly. Ajit gets afraid and starts to ask that how these mysterious deaths happen. Ajay replies to him that why is he asking these questions. Ajit starts blaming Pinky for all these deaths, but Ajay doesn't believe him and asks him how it can be. Ajit tells him that she is possessed by an evil spirit, but Ajay disagrees to his point, leading to an argument that Pinky is either innocent or guilty. But the argument stops when Usha calls Ajit to discuss whether to usurp her mother-in-law's property or celebrate her mother-in-law's funeral. He tells her that he saw a glance of Seema in Pinky's body, but she doesn't believe it as they buried her. He tells her that only buried her corpse, not her soul, he says that he is always victorious and sets a plan to demolish Seema' soul. Seema's soul gets out of Pinky's body and sets a plan to prove that Ajit is lying, Ajit along with Usha and Ajay take Pinky to another exorcist to whether check that Ajit is lying or not. Though the exorcist doesn't believe him he gives him an amulet to tie it on Pinky's neck and tells him that no soul will possess the girl. Meanwhile, Usha feels blood drops falling on her forehead from the ceiling of her room, the blood drops also fall on one of the cushions on her bed. She then runs out of fear, calls but nobody answers her call and the telephone is moved by Seema's soul invisibly, experiencing endless fear and sees Seema's soul standing in front of her to kill her. She asks as if she knows her or not, Usha then runs out of fear, but sees Seema's soul everywhere, every nook and corner she sees the soul. Seema's soul threatens her to strip her in this road, shows her monstrous face in front the crowd who run away. The monstrous apparition starts stripping her and strangles her and drowns her into a can of water. Ajit and Ajay arrives their home along with Pinky, who is angry with Ajay for obeying her brother's orders to take her to an exorcist and insult her. Ajay then takes out the amulet from her neck and also takes out his locket for her sake and the both have physical relationship with themselves. Ajit arrives home but get attacked by the monstrous apparition but manages to escape and starts his jeep and rides it towards the jungle where he buried her. Ajay and Pinky also goes behind Ajit to check whether he's alright or not. But Seema's soul also appears in front of his jeep, he takes out his revolver, starts firing her but fails. He then runs his jeep backward but Seema's soul also takes a turn behind him, blocking the way for him. He then starts the jeep and going to the front but Seema's monstrous apparition appears again while chasing him. He stops the jeep, due to which the monstrosity falls down. He tries to run over the jeep on to the monstrosity where he succeeds a little, but it seems short-lived and she appears on his jeep again to kill him. He rotates the jeep continuously until reaching the graveyard where she was buried. She then starts to attack all his remaining family members including Ajay and his wife. But Ajay then runs over the jeep on the monstrous apparition of the spirit, whose hand splits off her body to pull Ajit and bury him automatically with God's some powers. Ajay takes the sword and stabs it over that burial ground of Ajit. The film ends with Ajay and Pinky living happily ever after.

Cast 
 Javed Khan as Ajay
 Anil Dhawan as Pinky's father
 Beena Banerjee as Pinky's mother
 Jagdeep as Murlimanohar
 Mac Mohan as servant Babulal
 Rita Bhaduri as Ajit and Ajay's mother
 Sudhir Pandey as gardener
 Ajit Vachani as Ajit
 Tiku Talsania as Tiku
 Sargam as Pinky
 Sandhu Raj
 Seema Vaz as Seema/Seema's soul/Seema's monstrous version
 Tina Ghai

References

External links
 

1991 films
1990s Hindi-language films
Indian horror films
Indian films about revenge
1991 horror films
Hindi-language horror films